Owen Wister Award is an annual award from the Western Writers of America given to lifelong contributions to the field of Western literature. Named for writer Owen Wister (The Virginian; 1902), it is given for "Outstanding Contributions to the American West".

Originally given for "best book of the year", it was expanded in 1967 to include anyone advancing Western literature.

From 1961 to 1990 it was called the Saddleman Award (sculptor Spero Anargyros; polished bronze statuette of a cowboy in Levi’s, saddle slung over his right shoulder, branding iron in his left hand ) and sponsored by Levi Strauss & Co. After Levi Strauss dropped its sponsorship, the award was retitled the Owen Wister Award for "Lifetime Achievement" in Western history and literature. From 1991 to 1994 recipients received an engraved bronze figure of a cowboy,  since 1994 winners have received a bronze buffalo design on wood base from sculptor Robert H. Duffie.

Winners
<small>List of recipients of the Saddleman and Owen Wister.</small>

Saddleman
 Saddleman honorees are:
 1961: Will Henry
 1962: Jeanne Williams
 1963: Fred Grove
 1964: Mari Sandoz
 1965: Benjamin Capps  
 1966: Alvin M. Josephy, Jr.
 1967: S. Omar Barker
 1968: Nelson C. Nye
 1969: Frederick D. Glidden
 1970: John Wayne    
 1971: Thomas Thompson
 1972: John Ford
 1973: Glenn Vernam     
 1974: W. Foster-Harris
 1975: Nellie Snyder Yost
 1976: Dorothy M. Johnson
 1977: Elmer Kelton   
 1978: A. B. Guthrie, Jr.
 1979: Lewis B. Patten
 1980: C. L. Sonnichsen
 1981: Louis L'Amour
 1982: Eve Ball
 1983: Bill Gulick
 1984: Dee Brown
 1985: Leon Claire Metz
 1986: Jack Warner Schaefer
 1987: Clint Eastwood
 1988: Don Worcester
 1989: Wayne D. Overholser
 1990: Max Evans

Owen Wister
 Owen Wister'' honorees are:
 1991: Glendon Swarthout
 1992: Tom Lea
 1993: Douglas C. Jones
 1994: Robert M. Utley
 1995: Gordon D. Shirreffs
 1996: David Lavender
 1997: José Cisneros
No award was given in 1998.
 1999: Norman Zollinger
 2000: Dale L. Walker
 2001: Richard S. Wheeler
 2002: David Dary
 2003: Don Coldsmith
 2004: Matt Braun
 2005: Judy Alter
 2006: Andrew J. Fenady
 2007: John Jakes
 2008: Tony Hillerman
 2009: Elmore Leonard
 2010: N. Scott Momaday
 2011: James A. Crutchfield
 2012: Loren D. Estleman
 2013: Jory Sherman
 2014: Robert J. Conley
 2015: Win Blevins
 2016: Lucia St. Clair Robson
 2017: Louise Erdrich
 2018: Rudolfo Anaya
 2019: Will Bagley
 2020: Johnny D. Boggs

References

Culture of the Western United States
Western (genre) writers
American literary awards